The Athletic and Football Council of Erani is a sporting club in Filiatra, Greece.  It includes football (soccer), basketball and chess.

Informative sources

Erani was founded in 1935 and was fully recognized in 1947.  Its colours are green and white.  Its name came from Erana, an ancient city in the area of Triphylia.

Football (soccer)

In football (soccer), they had participated in the championship role in the organizations of the Messinia FCA and won the prefectural championship several times.  It most wins are in the Messinia Cup with six titles and nine participations in the finals.

From 1989-90, the team participated in many times in the Fourth Division and the Third Division in the 1993-94 season.  In recent years and the 2009-10 season, they currently play in the Fourth Division.

Players

From Erani featured many famous footballers or soccer players which played in teams at the first and second division.  The most famous of these were the Liberopoulos cousins and Nikos Froussos:

Nikos Liberopoulos, played with his great career at PAO, AEK and in Germany.
Sotiris Liberopoulos, played for the Greek team under 21 and played many times in the First Division.
Nikolaos Frousos, played in Ionikos, PAOK and Anorthosis.

Playoff history

The time that Erani entered the finals was in 1990 and challenged Miltiadis and lost 2-1, their next chance was in 1992 and challenged with Apollon Kalamata, their luck for their first title failed as they lost 2-1, then again Erani lost 2-1 with Messini the following year.  Their first cup was not achieved until 1995 when they bet Omonoia Kalamata 3-0.  In 2001, they won their second beating Messiniakos 3-2, their third beating Pamissos Messini 2-0 and their fourth with the same team but tied apiece but won by penalty kicks.  Their fifth was with another rival Sperchogeia beating them 1-0.  Their sixth and recent title was won when the Erani beat over Messiniakos with 1-0.

Achievements

Messinia Football Clubs Association:
1989
Messinia Cup (6):
1995, 2001, 2002, 2003, 2004, 2009
Messinia Cup (finalist) (3):
1990, 1992, 1993

Current players
As of the 2008-09 season:

Adamopoulos
Alexandropoulos
Anastasopoulos
Andreopoulos
Anestopoulos
Assimakopoulos
Athanassopoulos
Haralambos Diniotis
Ilias Diniotis
Giannis
Giannakopoulos
Varouchas Hatzipanagiotis
Kollias
Korbis
Mantzavinos
Mouhikas
Nikolopoulos
Panagiotakopoulos
Panagiotidis
Pinchioni
Tsonis
Zokos

Basketball
The team plays locally in the EKASKENOP championships.  In the 2007-08 season, Erani plays in the third division.

References

External links
Municipality of Filatra Official website of Erani

Association football clubs established in 1935
Basketball teams in Greece
Sport in Messenia
Football clubs in Peloponnese (region)
1935 establishments in Greece